A hyperloop is a proposed high-speed transportation system for both public and goods transport. The idea was picked up by Elon Musk to describe a modern project based on the vactrain concept (first appearance in 1799). Hyperloop systems have three essential elements: tubes, pods, and terminals. The tube is a large, sealed low-pressure system (usually a long tunnel). The pod is a coach pressurized at atmospheric pressure that runs substantially free of air resistance or friction inside this tube using magnetic propulsion (in some cases augmented by a ducted fan). The terminal handles pod arrivals and departures. The Hyperloop, in the initial form proposed by Musk, differs from vactrains by relying on residual air pressure inside the tube to provide lift by aerofoils and propulsion by fans.

The hyperloop has its roots in a concept by George Medhurst in 1799 and subsequently developed under the names pneumatic railway, atmospheric railway or vactrain. Elon Musk renewed interest in hyperloop after mentioning it in a 2012 speaking event. Musk further promoted the concept by publishing a white paper in August 2013, which conceived of a hyperloop route running from the Los Angeles region to the San Francisco Bay Area, roughly following the Interstate 5 corridor. His initial concept incorporated reduced-pressure tubes in which pressurized capsules ride on air bearings driven by linear induction motors and axial compressors. Transportation analysts challenged the cost estimates included in the white paper, with some predicting that a realized hyperloop would be several billion dollars over budget.

The hyperloop concept has been promoted by Musk and SpaceX, and other companies or organizations have been encouraged to collaborate and develop the technology.

In July 2021, hyperloop startup Swisspod Technologies, in collaboration with École Polytechnique Fédérale de Lausanne (EPFL), unveiled Europe's first operational hyperloop testing facility. The project was funded by the Swiss Government and is located in Lausanne, Switzerland, on the EPFL campus. The reduced-scale test track has been constructed in a circular shape to simulate an "infinite" hyperloop trajectory. This distinctive feature provides the flexibility to accommodate diverse experiments for testing different levels of pressure, and trajectory lengths, as well as the electromagnetic propulsion and levitation systems of the capsule at medium speeds and long distances.

History 
After being conceived in 1799, the vactrain was invented in 1904 by Robert H. Goddard, a freshman at Worcester Polytechnic Institute.

Musk first mentioned that he was thinking about a concept for a "fifth mode of transport", calling it the Hyperloop, in July 2012 at a PandoDaily event in Santa Monica, California. This hypothetical high-speed mode of transportation would have the following characteristics: immunity to weather, collision free, twice the speed of a plane, low power consumption, and energy storage for 24-hour operations. The name Hyperloop was chosen because it would go in a loop. Musk envisions the more advanced versions will be able to go at hypersonic speed. In May 2013, Musk likened his Hyperloop to a "cross between a Concorde and a railgun and an air hockey table".

From late 2012 until August 2013, a group of engineers from both Tesla and SpaceX worked on the modeling of Musk's Hyperloop. An early system conceptual model was published in the Tesla and SpaceX blogs which describes one potential design, function, pathway, and cost of a hyperloop system. According to the alpha design, pods would accelerate to cruising speeds gradually using linear electric motors and glide above their track on air bearings through tubes above ground on columns or below ground in tunnels to avoid the dangers of grade crossings. An ideal hyperloop system will be more energy-efficient, quiet, and autonomous than existing modes of mass transit. Musk has also invited feedback to "see if the people can find ways to improve it". The Hyperloop Alpha was released as an open source design. The trademark "HYPERLOOP", applicable to "high-speed transportation of goods in tubes" was issued to SpaceX on 4 April 2017.

In June 2015, SpaceX announced that it would build a  test track to be located next to SpaceX's Hawthorne facility. The track was completed and used to test pod designs supplied by third parties in the competition.

By November 2015, with several commercial companies and dozens of student teams pursuing the development of Hyperloop technologies, the Wall Street Journal asserted that "The Hyperloop Movement", as some of its unaffiliated members refer to themselves, is officially bigger than the man who started it."

The Massachusetts Institute of Technology (MIT) hyperloop team developed the first hyperloop pod prototype, which they unveiled at the MIT Museum on 13 May 2016. Their design uses electrodynamic suspension for levitating and eddy current braking.

Theory and operation

The vactrain concept resembles a high-speed rail system without substantial air resistance by employing magnetically levitating trains in evacuated (airless) or partly evacuated tubes. However, the difficulty of maintaining a vacuum over large distances has prevented this type of system from ever being built.

Initial design concept

The hyperloop concept operates by sending specially designed "capsules" or "pods" through a steel tube maintained at a partial vacuum. In Musk's original concept, each capsule would float on a  layer of air provided under pressure to air-caster "skis", similar to how pucks are levitated above an air hockey table, while still allowing higher speeds than wheels can sustain. With rolling resistance eliminated and air resistance greatly reduced, the capsules can glide for the bulk of the journey. In the alpha design concept, an electrically driven inlet fan and axial compressor would be placed at the nose of the capsule to "actively transfer high-pressure air from the front to the rear of the vessel", resolving the problem of air pressure building in front of the vehicle, slowing it down. A fraction of the air was to be shunted to the skis for additional pressure, augmenting that gain passively from lift due to their shape.

(Section 4.4) The design proposed passengers experience a maximum inertial acceleration of 0.5 g, about 2 or 3 times that of a commercial airliner on takeoff and landing.

Proposed routes

A number of routes have been proposed for hyperloop systems that meet the approximate distance conditions for which a hyperloop is hypothesized to provide improved transport times (distances of under approximately ). Route proposals range from speculation described in company releases to business cases to signed agreements.

United States 
The route suggested in the 2013 alpha-level design document was from the Greater Los Angeles Area to the San Francisco Bay Area. That conceptual system would begin around Sylmar, just south of the Tejon Pass, follow Interstate 5 to the north, and arrive near Hayward on the east side of San Francisco Bay. Several proposed branches were also shown in the design document, including Sacramento, Anaheim, San Diego, and Las Vegas.

No work has been done on the route proposed in Musk's alpha-design; one cited reason is that it would terminate on the fringes of the two major metropolitan areas (Los Angeles and San Francisco), resulting in significant cost savings in construction, but requiring that passengers traveling to and from Downtown Los Angeles and San Francisco, and any other community beyond Sylmar and Hayward, to transfer to another transportation mode in order to reach their final destination. This would significantly lengthen the total travel time to those destinations.

A similar problem already affects present-day air travel, where on short routes (like LAX–SFO) the flight time is only a rather small part of door-to-door travel time. Critics have argued that this would significantly reduce the proposed cost and/or time savings of hyperloop as compared to the proposed California High-Speed Rail project that will serve downtown stations in both San Francisco and Los Angeles. Passengers traveling from financial center to financial center are estimated to save about two hours by taking the Hyperloop instead of driving the whole distance.

Others questioned the cost projections for the suggested California route. Some transportation engineers argued in 2013 that they found the alpha-level design cost estimates unrealistically low given the scale of construction and reliance on unproven technology. The technological and economic feasibility of the idea is unproven and a subject of significant debate.

In November 2017, Arrivo announced a concept for a maglev automobile transport system from Aurora, Colorado to Denver International Airport, the first leg of a system from downtown Denver. Its contract described potential completion of a first leg in 2021. In February 2018, Hyperloop Transportation Technologies announced a similar plan for a loop connecting Chicago and Cleveland and a loop connecting Washington and New York City.

In 2018 the Missouri Hyperloop Coalition was formed between Virgin Hyperloop One, the University of Missouri, and engineering firm Black & Veatch to study a proposed route connecting St. Louis, Columbia, and Kansas City.

On 19 December 2018, Elon Musk unveiled a  tunnel below Los Angeles. In the presentation, a Tesla Model X drove in a tunnel on the predefined track (rather than in a low-pressure tube). Musk said: "The Loop is a stepping stone toward hyperloop. The Loop is for transport within a city. Hyperloop is for transport between cities, and that would go much faster than 150 mph."

The Northeast Ohio Areawide Coordinating Agency, or NOACA, partnered with Hyperloop Transportation Technologies to conduct a $1.3 million feasibility study for developing a hyperloop corridor route from Chicago to Cleveland and Pittsburgh for America's first multistate hyperloop system in the Great Lakes Megaregion. Hundreds of thousands of dollars already have been committed to the project. NOACA's Board of Directors has awarded a $550,029 contract to Transportation Economics & Management Systems, Inc. (TEMS) for the Great Lakes Hyperloop Feasibility Study to evaluate the feasibility of an ultra-high speed hyperloop passenger and freight transport system initially linking Cleveland and Chicago.

India 
HTT also signed an agreement with Andhra Pradesh government to build India's first hyperloop project connecting Amaravathi to Vijayawada in a 6-minute ride.

On 22 February 2018, Hyperloop One entered into a memorandum of understanding with the Government of Maharashtra to build a hyperloop transportation system between Mumbai and Pune that would cut the travel time from the current 180 minutes to 20 minutes.

Indore-based Dinclix GroundWorks' DGWHyperloop advocates a hyperloop corridor between Mumbai and Delhi, via Indore, Kota, and Jaipur.

The Ministry of Railways will collaborate with IIT Madras for the development of an "indigenous" Hyperloop system and will help set-up a Centre of Excellence for Hyperloop Technologies at IIT.

Saudi Arabia 
On 6 February 2020, the Ministry of Transport in the Kingdom of Saudi Arabia announced a contract agreement with Virgin Hyperloop One (VHO) to conduct a ground-breaking pre-feasibility study on the use of hyperloop technology for the transport of passengers and cargo. The study will serve as a blueprint for future hyperloop projects and build on the developers long-standing relationship with the kingdom, which has peaked when His Royal Highness Prince Mohammed bin Salman bin Abdulaziz bin Abdul Rahman al Saud, Crown Prince of Saudi Arabia, viewed VHO's passenger pod during a visit to the United States.

Italy 

On 29 December 2021, the Veneto Regional Council approved a memorandum of understanding with MIMS and CAV for the testing of hyper transfer technology. By mid 2023, the feasibility study by a company selected by CAV will have to be completed and the development of a first prototype completed in 2026. 4 million euro have been allocated for this phase.

Canada 

Canadian hyperloop firm TransPod is exploring the possibility of hyperloop routes which would connect Toronto and Montreal, Toronto to Windsor, and Calgary to Edmonton. Toronto and Montreal, the largest cities in Canada, are connected by Ontario Highway 401, the busiest highway in North America. In March 2019, Transport Canada commissioned the study of hyperloops, so it can be "better informed on the technical, operational, economic, safety, and regulatory aspects of the hyperloop and understand its construction requirements and commercial feasibility."

The province of Alberta signed a memorandum of understanding (MOU) to support TransPod for its Calgary to Edmonton hyperloop project. TransPod plans to move forward and has secured  in private capital funding for the first phase which will create an airport link for Edmonton. However, the company will first need to build and test prototypes on test tracks before the project can begin.

Elsewhere in the world 
In 2016, Hyperloop One published the world's first detailed business case for a  route between Helsinki and Stockholm, which would tunnel under the Baltic Sea to connect the two capitals in under 30 minutes. Hyperloop One undertook a feasibility study with DP World to move containers from its Port of Jebel Ali in Dubai. In late 2016, Hyperloop One announced a feasibility study with Dubai's Roads and Transport Authority for passenger and freight routes connecting Dubai with the greater United Arab Emirates. Hyperloop One was also considering passenger routes in Moscow during 2016, and a cargo hyperloop to connect Hunchun in north-eastern China to the Port of Zarubino, near Vladivostok and the North Korean border on Russia's Far East. In May 2016, Hyperloop One kicked off their Global Challenge with a call for comprehensive proposals of hyperloop networks around the world. In September 2017, Hyperloop One selected 10 routes from 35 of the strongest proposals: Toronto–Montreal, Cheyenne–Denver–Pueblo, Miami–Orlando, Dallas–Laredo–Houston, Chicago–Columbus–Pittsburgh, Mexico City–Guadalajara, Edinburgh–London, Glasgow–Liverpool, Bengaluru–Chennai, and Mumbai–Chennai.

Others have put forward European routes, including a route beginning at Amsterdam or Schiphol airport to Frankfurt. In 2016, a Warsaw University of Technology team began evaluating potential routes from Cracow to Gdańsk across Poland proposed by Hyper Poland.

Hyperloop Transportation Technologies (HTT) reportedly signed an agreement with the government of Slovakia in March 2016 to perform impact studies, with potential links between Bratislava, Vienna, and Budapest, but there have been no further developments. In January 2017, HTT signed an agreement to explore the route Bratislava—Brno—Prague in Central Europe.

In 2017, SINTEF, the largest independent research organization in Scandinavia, announced they were considering building a test lab for hyperloop in Norway.

An agreement was signed in June 2017 to co-develop a hyperloop line between Seoul and Busan, South Korea.

Mars
According to Musk, hyperloop would be useful on Mars as no tubes would be needed because Mars' atmosphere is about 1% the density of the Earth's at sea level. For the hyperloop concept to work on Earth, low-pressure tubes are required to reduce air resistance. However, if they were to be built on Mars, the lower air resistance would allow a hyperloop to be created with no tube, only a track, and so would be just a magnetically levitating train.

Open-source design evolution
In September 2013, Ansys Corporation ran computational fluid dynamics simulations to model the aerodynamics of the capsule and shear stress forces to which the capsule would be subjected. The simulation showed that the capsule design would need to be significantly reshaped to avoid creating supersonic airflow, and that the gap between the tube wall and capsule would need to be larger. Ansys employee Sandeep Sovani said the simulation showed that hyperloop has challenges but that he is convinced it is feasible.

In October 2013, the development team of the OpenMDAO software framework released an unfinished, conceptual open-source model of parts of the hyperloop's propulsion system. The team asserted that the model demonstrated the concept's feasibility, although the tube would need to be  in diameter, significantly larger than originally projected. However, the team's model is not a true working model of the propulsion system, as it did not account for a wide range of technical factors required to physically construct a hyperloop based on Musk's concept, and in particular had no significant estimations of component weight.

In November 2013, MathWorks analyzed the proposal's suggested route and concluded that the route was mainly feasible. The analysis focused on the acceleration experienced by passengers and the necessary deviations from public roads in order to keep the accelerations reasonable; it did highlight that maintaining a trajectory along I-580 east of San Francisco at the planned speeds was not possible without significant deviation into heavily populated areas.

In January 2015, a paper based on the NASA OpenMDAO open-source model reiterated the need for a larger diameter tube and a reduced cruise speed closer to Mach 0.85. It recommended removing on-board heat exchangers based on thermal models of the interactions between the compressor cycle, tube, and ambient environment. The compression cycle would only contribute 5% of the heat added to the tube, with 95% of the heat attributed to radiation and convection into the tube.

According to Musk, various aspects of the hyperloop have technology applications to other Musk interests, including surface transportation on Mars and electric jet propulsion.

Researchers associated with MIT's department of Aeronautics and Astronautics published research in June 2017 that verified the challenge of aerodynamic design near the Kantrowitz limit that had been theorized in the original SpaceX Alpha-design concept released in 2013.

In 2017, Dr. Richard Geddes and others formed the Hyperloop Advanced Research Partnership to act as a clearinghouse of Hyperloop public domain reports and data.

In February 2020, Hardt Hyperloop, Hyper Poland, TransPod and Zeleros formed a consortium to drive standardization efforts, as part of a joint technical committee (JTC20) set up by European standards bodies CEN and CENELEC to develop common standards aimed at ensuring the safety and interoperability of infrastructure, rolling stock, signaling and other systems.

Hyperloop research programs

TUM Hyperloop (previously WARR Hyperloop)
TUM Hyperloop is a research program that emerged in 2019 from the team of hyperloop pod competition from the Technical University of Munich. The research program has the goals to investigate the technical feasibility by means of a demonstrator, as well as by simulating the economic and technical feasibility of the hyperloop system. The planned 24 meter demonstrator will consist of a tube and the full-size pod. The next steps after completion of the first project phase are the extension to 400 meters to investigate higher speeds. This is planned in the Munich area, in Taufkirchen, Ottobrunn or at the Oberpfaffenhofen airfield.

Eurotube 
EuroTube is a non-profit research organization for the development of vacuum transport technology. EuroTube is currently developing a  test tube in Collombey-Muraz, Switzerland. The organization was founded in 2017 at ETH Zurich as a Swiss association and became a Swiss foundation in 2019. The test tube is planned on a 2:1 scale with a diameter of 2.2 m and designed for

Hyperloop pod competition

A number of student and non-student teams were participating in a hyperloop pod competition in 2015–16, and at least 22 of them built hardware to compete on a sponsored hyperloop test track in mid-2016.

In June 2015, SpaceX announced that they would sponsor a hyperloop pod design competition and would build a  subscale test track near SpaceX's headquarters in Hawthorne, California, for the competitive event in 2016. SpaceX stated in their announcement, "Neither SpaceX nor Elon Musk is affiliated with any Hyperloop companies. While we are not developing a commercial Hyperloop ourselves, we are interested in helping to accelerate development of a functional Hyperloop prototype."

More than 700 teams had submitted preliminary applications by July. A preliminary design briefing was held in November 2015, where more than 120 student engineering teams were selected to submit Final Design Packages due by 13 January 2016.

A Design Weekend was held at Texas A&M University 29–30 January 2016, for all invited entrants. Engineers from the Massachusetts Institute of Technology were named the winners of the competition. While the University of Washington team won the Safety Subsystem Award, Delft University won the Pod Innovation Award as well as the second place, followed by the University of Wisconsin–Madison, Virginia Tech, and the University of California, Irvine. In the Design Category, the winning team was Hyperloop UPV from Universitat Politecnica de Valencia, Spain. On 29 January 2017, Delft Hyperloop (Delft University of Technology) won the prize for the "best overall design" at the final stage of the SpaceX hyperloop competition, while WARR Hyperloop of the Technical University of Munich won the prize for "fastest pod". The Massachusetts Institute of Technology placed third.

The second hyperloop pod competition took place from 25 to 27 August 2017. The only judging criteria being top speed provided it is followed by successful deceleration.

A third hyperloop pod competition took place in July 2018. The defending champions, the WARR Hyperloop team from the Technical University of Munich, beat their own record with a top speed of  during their run. The Delft Hyperloop team representing Delft University of Technology landed in second place, while the EPFLoop team from École Polytechnique Fédérale de Lausanne (EPFL) earned the third-place finish.

Criticism and human factor considerations
Critics have described hyperloop as a kind of gadgetbahn because it would be an expensive, unproven system that is no better than existing technology like traditional high-speed rail. Some critics of hyperloop focus on the experience—possibly unpleasant and frightening—of riding in a narrow, sealed, windowless capsule inside a sealed steel tunnel, that is subjected to significant acceleration forces; high noise levels due to air being compressed and ducted around the capsule at near-sonic speeds; and the vibration and jostling. Even if the tube is initially smooth, ground may shift with seismic activity. At high speeds, even minor deviations from a straight path may add considerable buffeting. This is in addition to practical and logistical questions regarding how to best deal with safety issues such as equipment malfunction, accidents, and emergency evacuations.

Other maglev trains are already in use, which avoid much of the added costs of hyperloop. The SCMaglev in Japan has demonstrated  without a vacuum tube, by using an extremely aerodynamic train design. It also avoids the cost and time required to pressurize and depressurize the exit and entry points of a hyperloop tube.

There is also the criticism of design technicalities in the tube system. John Hansman, professor of aeronautics and astronautics at MIT, has stated problems, such as how a slight misalignment in the tube would be compensated for and the potential interplay between the air cushion and the low-pressure air. He has also questioned what would happen if the power were to go out when the pod was miles away from a city. UC Berkeley physics professor Richard Muller has also expressed concern regarding "[the Hyperloop's] novelty and the vulnerability of its tubes, [which] would be a tempting target for terrorists", and that the system could be disrupted by everyday dirt and grime.

Political and economic considerations
The alpha proposal projected that cost savings compared with conventional rail would come from a combination of several factors. The small profile and elevated nature of the alpha route would enable hyperloop to be constructed primarily in the median of Interstate 5. However, whether this would be truly feasible is a matter of debate. The low profile would reduce tunnel boring requirements and the light weight of the capsules is projected to reduce construction costs over conventional passenger rail. It was asserted that there would be less right-of-way opposition and environmental impact as well due to its small, sealed, elevated profile versus that of a rail easement; however, other commentators contend that a smaller footprint does not guarantee less opposition. In criticizing this assumption, mass transportation writer Alon Levy said, "In reality, an all-elevated system (which is what Musk proposes with the Hyperloop) is a bug rather than a feature. Central Valley land is cheap; pylons are expensive, as can be readily seen by the costs of elevated highways and trains all over the world".

No total ticket price was suggested in the alpha design in Elon Musk's initial whitepaper. Projected low ticket prices by hyperloop developers have been questioned by Dan Sperling, director of the Institute of Transportation Studies at University of California Davis, who stated that "there's no way the economics on that would ever work out." Some critics have argued that, since hyperloops are designed to carry fewer passengers than typical public train systems, it could make it difficult to price tickets to cover the costs of construction and running.

The early cost estimates of the hyperloop are a subject of debate. A number of economists and transportation experts have expressed the belief that the  price tag dramatically understates the cost of designing, developing, constructing, and testing an all-new form of transportation. The Economist magazine said that the estimates are unlikely to "be immune to the hypertrophication of cost that every other grand infrastructure project seems doomed to suffer."

Political impediments to the construction of such a project in California may be large due to the "political and reputation capital" invested in the existing mega-project of California High-Speed Rail. Because replacing that with a different design would not be straightforward given California's political economy, Texas has been suggested as an alternate for its more amenable political and economic environment.

Building a successful hyperloop sub-scale demonstration project could reduce the political impediments and improve cost estimates. Musk has suggested that he may be personally involved in building a demonstration prototype of the hyperloop concept, including funding the development effort, yet to happen as of 2020.

The solar panels Musk plans to install along the length of the hyperloop system have been criticized by engineering professor Roger Goodall of Loughborough University, as not being feasible enough to return enough energy to power the hyperloop system, arguing that the air pumps and propulsion would require much more power than the solar panels could generate.

According to The New York Times, "The central impediment" to the hyperloop is that it "would require creating an entire infrastructure. That means constructing miles-long systems of tubes and stations, acquiring rights of way, adhering to government regulations and standards, and avoiding changes to the ecology along its routes."

Hyperloop companies

Related projects

Historical

The concept of transportation of passengers in pneumatic tubes is not new. The first patent to transport goods in tubes was created in 1799 by the British mechanical engineer and inventor George Medhurst. In 1812, Medhurst wrote a book detailing his idea of transporting passengers and goods through air-tight tubes using air propulsion.

In the early 1800s, there were other similar systems proposed or experimented with and were generally known as atmospheric railway projects, though this term is now also used for systems where the propulsion is provided by a separate pneumatic tube to the train tunnel itself.

One of the earliest constructions was the Dalkey Atmospheric Railway which operated near Dublin between 1844 and 1854.

The tunnels are now lost but the line operated successfully for over a year.

Operated from 1870 to 1873, the Beach Pneumatic Transit was a one-block-long prototype of an underground tube transport public transit system in New York City. The system worked at near-atmospheric pressure, and the passenger car moved by means of higher pressure air applied to the back of the car while comparatively lower pressure air was maintained on the front of the car.

In the 1910s, vacuum trains were first described by American rocket pioneer Robert Goddard. While the hyperloop has significant innovations when compared to early proposals for reduced pressure or vacuum-tube transportation apparatuses, the work of Goddard "appears to have the greatest overlap with the Hyperloop".

In 1981, Princeton physicist Gerard K. O'Neill wrote about transcontinental trains using magnetic propulsion in his book 2081: A Hopeful View of the Human Future. Though being a work of fiction, this book was an attempt to predict future technologies in everyday life. In his prediction, he envisioned these trains which used magnetic levitation running in tunnels which had much of the air evacuated to increase speed and significantly reduce friction. He also demonstrated a scale prototype device that accelerated an object using magnetic propulsion to high speeds. It was called a mass driver and was a central theme in his non-fiction book on space colonization "The High Frontier".

Swissmetro was a proposal to run a maglev train in a low-pressure environment. Concessions were granted to Swissmetro in the early 2000s to connect the Swiss cities of St. Gallen, Zurich, Basel, and Geneva. Studies of commercial feasibility reached differing conclusions and the vactrain was never built.

The ET3 Global Alliance (ET3) was founded by Daryl Oster in 1997 with the goal of establishing a global transportation system using passenger capsules in frictionless maglev full-vacuum tubes. Oster and his team met with Elon Musk on 18 September 2013, to discuss the technology, resulting in Musk promising an investment in a  prototype of ET3's proposed design.

From 2003 Franco Cotana led the development of Pipenet which had a small bore evacuated tube for moving freight at up to  using linear synchronous motors and magnetic levitation. However development stopped after funding ceased.

China was reported to be building a vacuum based  maglev train in August 2010 according to a laboratory at Southwest Jiaotong University. It was expected to cost  ( at the August 2010 exchange rate) more per kilometer than regular high-speed rail. In 2018 a  loop test track was completed to test some of the technology.

In 2018, the new concept of creating and using intermodal hyperloop capsules was presented. After detaching the drive elements, capsules could be used in a way similar to traditional containers for fast transport of goods or individuals. It has been proposed that specialized airplanes, dedicated high-speed trains, road tractors or watercrafts perform "last mile" transport for solving the problem of fast transportation to centers where hyperloop terminals are locally unavailable or infeasible to be constructed.

In May 2021, it was reported that a low-vacuum sealed tube test system capable of reaching speeds around  had begun construction in Datong, Shanxi Province. An initial  section was completed in 2022 and the full  test line is planned to be completed within two years. The line is being constructed by the North University of China and the Third Research Institute of China Aerospace Science and Industry Corporation.

In July 2021, the first European operational hyperloop testing facility was presented. The infrastructure was built by the Swiss-American startup Swisspod Technologies and the Distributed Electrical Systems Laboratory (DESL) of École Polytechnique Fédérale de Lausanne. The low-pressure tube was designed in a circular shape to simulate an infinite Hyperloop trajectory. This will allow for fundamental, more accurate experiments related to the capsule's efficiency, electromagnetic propulsion, and levitation systems when exposed to high speeds on long distances. The tube is made of aluminum alloy, has a diameter of 40 m (131.2 ft), and is 120 m (393.7 ft) long.

In September 2021, Swisspod Technologies and MxV Rail (formerly TTCI), a subsidiary of the Association of American Railroads (AAR), started a collaboration for building a full-scale testing facility for hyperloop technology on the Pueblo Plex campus in Pueblo, Colorado, US. The primary purpose of this facility is to conduct research and development activities on Swisspod's proprietary hyperloop propulsion system. Additionally, the company plans to build a full-scale capsule and establish a functional infrastructure for testing hyperloop systems for cargo transportation.

See also

 Gravity train
 Gravity-vacuum transit
 Ground effect train
 High-speed rail
 Kantrowitz limit
 Maglev
 Pneumatic tube
 Swissmetro
 Transatlantic tunnel
 Vactrain

References

External links

 
 Video of First Successful Test Ride—Wired via YouTube
 Eurotube.org

 
Elon Musk
Emerging technologies
Experimental vehicles
High-speed rail
Linear induction motors
Open hardware vehicles
Transport systems
Vacuum systems